Addington Village Interchange is a light rail stop and associated bus station serving Addington in the London Borough of Croydon in the southern suburbs of London. It opened on 10 May 2000 along with the line to New Addington.

Tramlink Services
Addington Village is served by tram services operated by Tramlink. The tram stop is served by trams every 7-8 minutes between New Addington and  via  and Centrale.

During the evenings on weekends, the service is reduced to a tram every 15 minutes.

Services are operated using Bombardier CR4000 and Stadler Variobahn Trams.

Bus Connections
The bus station is served by London Buses routes 64, 130, 314, 353, 359, 433, 466 and school routes 654 and 664. These provide connections to New Addington, Croydon Town Centre, Purley, Caterham, Thornton Heath, Hayes, Orpington, Bromley and Eltham.

Free interchange for journeys made within an hour between bus services and between buses and trams is available at Addington Village as part of Transport for London's Hopper Fare.

References

External links

Tramlink stops in the London Borough of Croydon
Railway stations in Great Britain opened in 2000